Rank comparison chart of all armies and land forces of the European Union member states.

Officers (OF 1–10) 

Remark:
NATO STANAG 2116 lists Officer Designates (listed here as OF(D)) of some countries alongside OF-1 ranks.

See also 
Comparative army enlisted ranks of the European Union
Military rank
Comparative navy officer ranks of the European Union
Comparative navy enlisted ranks of the European Union
Comparative air force officer ranks of the European Union
Comparative air force enlisted ranks of the European Union
Ranks and insignia of NATO armies officers
Comparative army officer ranks of Europe

Notes

References 
 STANAG 2116 NATO chart

Military comparisons